The Mixed Team tournament in Judo at the 2010 Summer Youth Olympics was held on August 25 at the International Convention Centre.

Athletes of all weight classes were split into groups of 7 or 8 athletes in one of 12 teams.  The tournament bracket consisted of a single-elimination contest where the team with the most wins moves to the next round culminating in a gold match.  There were no repechages in this event, the two losing semi-finalists received bronze medals.

Medalists

Teams

Results

Main Bracket

References
 

Judo at the 2010 Summer Youth Olympics
Youth Olympics, 2010